The Rossion Q1 is an American mid-engined sports car from American car maker Rossion Automotive. Development on the Rossion Q1 began after the rights to the Noble M400 chassis were acquired in February 2007. The goal was to design a completely new car fusing the sporty strengths of the M400 with luxurious appointments. In June 2013, RP High Performance acquired Mosler Automotive (based in Riviera Beach, Florida USA) and moved the entire manufacturing facility from South Africa to the current location in the United States. Production of the Rossion Q1R,  the track version of the existing Q1 model, began in July 2013. A redesign of the Mosler is underway, with the car to be released in the future with no definitive date yet planned. Current Q1 and Q1R models feature a fully carbon-kevlar body.

Powertrain 

Performance  
It has a power-to-weight ratio of /ton.
manufacturer estimates based on climate conditions and driver capability.

Design 

The body for the Q1 has been redesigned with total carbon-kevlar body, a new front end, large integrated air intakes and ram air side window ducts. A rear carbon-kevlar diffuser, in conjunction with the flat under tray, creates downforce on the chassis for high speed grip and stability. Other improvements over the M400 include power windows, remote power side mirrors, LCD touch-screen management system, back up camera, WiFi with bluetooth compatibility, smartphone link and center mounted wide screen entertainment system. Based on the Rossion website the Rossion Q1 will be available with unlimited body colors, but popular combinations are named and coordinated for national racing colors and famous race circuits around the world. The interior has also been redesigned to be intuitive and comfortable but without extraneous features consisting of high grade leather, Alcantara and diamond stitching options.

References

External links 
 
Rossion Spec - specification of the Rossion Q1

Sports cars
Rear mid-engine, rear-wheel-drive vehicles
Cars introduced in 2008
2010s cars